Peter Mathieson may refer to:
Peter Mathieson (nephrologist) (born 1959), English nephrologist and Vice-Chancellor and Principal of the University of Edinburgh
Peter Mathieson (swimmer) (1914–1986), New Zealand swimmer

See also 
Peter Matheson (disambiguation)
Peter Matthiessen (1927–2014), American novelist, naturalist